Floyd Anthony Guthrie Bell (born 14 March 1966) is a Guatemalan-Costa Rican retired footballer who has played as a defender, midfielder and forward.

Club career
A versatile player, Limón-born Guthrie started his career at Uruguay de Coronado and also played for  Herediano and Municipal Turrialba in Costa Rica before moving abroad.

He had spells in Honduras with Victoria, in El Salvador with Luis Ángel Firpo, in Mexico with UA Tamaulipas but spent the majority of his career abroad in Guatemala, playing for Comunicaciones, Antigua, Suchitepéquez and Petapa.

In March 2001, Guthrie returned to Herediano and later played for Pérez Zeledón before moving back to Guatemala. Guthrie has become a Guatemalan citizen.

International career
Guthrie made his debut for Costa Rica in an April 1991 friendly match against Mexico and earned a total of 33 caps, scoring 3 goals. He has represented his country in 4 FIFA World Cup qualification matches and played at the 1991, 1993 and 1995 UNCAF Nations Cups  as well as at the 1991, 1993 and 1998 CONCACAF Gold Cups.

His final international match was a February 1998 CONCACAF Gold Cup match against the United States.

Personal life
Guthrie is married to Waleska Loaiza.

References

External links

1966 births
Living people
People from Limón Province
Naturalized citizens of Guatemala
Costa Rican emigrants to Guatemala
Association football midfielders
Costa Rican footballers
Costa Rica international footballers
1991 CONCACAF Gold Cup players
1993 CONCACAF Gold Cup players
1993 UNCAF Nations Cup players
1995 UNCAF Nations Cup players
1998 CONCACAF Gold Cup players
C.S. Herediano footballers
C.D. Victoria players
Comunicaciones F.C. players
C.D. Luis Ángel Firpo footballers
Correcaminos UAT footballers
Municipal Pérez Zeledón footballers
C.D. Suchitepéquez players
Costa Rican expatriate footballers
Expatriate footballers in Honduras
Expatriate footballers in Guatemala
Expatriate footballers in El Salvador
Expatriate footballers in Mexico
Antigua GFC players
Deportivo Petapa players